Hemmatabad (also Romanized as Hemmatābād and Himmatābād) is a village in Khodabandehlu Rural District, in the Central District of Sahneh County, Kermanshah Province, Iran. At the 2006 census, its population was 119, in 24 families.

References 

Populated places in Sahneh County